The Canadian Automotive Museum is an automobile museum located in Oshawa, Ontario, Canada. The museum features many Canadian-made cars as the automobile industry, specifically the Canadian division of the General Motors, known as General Motors Canada, which has always been at the forefront of Oshawa's economy.

The museum was founded in 1962 by a group of Oshawa businessmen through the Oshawa Chamber of Commerce. The venture was initiated mainly to preserve the automotive history of Canada and to present this history in an educational and entertaining manner. Canadian Automotive Museum Inc is a charitable corporation and has been in operation since 1963.

The museum is housed in a  building in downtown Oshawa that was originally the location of Ontario Motor Sales, a local car dealership, in the 1920s. The building maintains its original period architecture right down to the original elevator used to move cars to the second floor.

The Museum is affiliated with: CMA, CHIN, and the Virtual Museum of Canada.

Vehicles on display
The museum has two floors: the ground floors features foreign cars, while the upstairs features a "Made in Canada" exhibit.

See also

Manitoba Antique Automobile Museum
McLaughlin Carriage Company

References

External links

Automobile museums in Ontario
Buildings and structures in Oshawa
Museums in the Regional Municipality of Durham
Museums established in 1962
1962 establishments in Ontario